The 2018–19 Slovak Basketball League season will be the 27th season of the top-tier basketball competition in Slovakia. Levickí Patrioti are the defending champions.

Competition format
Ten teams joined the regular season, consisted in playing against each other four times home-and-away in double a round-robin format. The eight first qualified teams advance to the playoffs.

Teams

After the resignation of Košice, runner-up of the previous season, to continue playing in the league, Lučenec, champion of the 1.Liga, replaced them. Also, VŠEMvs Karlovka Bratislava resigned to the league thus reducing the number of teams to nine.

Regular season

League table

Results

Playoffs
Seeded teams played games 1, 3, 5 and 7 at home. Quarterfinals were played in a best-of-five games format while semifinals and final with a best-of-seven one.

Bracket

Quarter-finals

|}

Semi-finals

|}

Finals

|}

Slovak clubs in European competitions

References

External links
Slovak Extraliga official website

Slovak
Basketball
Slovak Extraliga (basketball)